Xatśūll First Nation formerly known as Soda Creek Indian Band, is a First Nations government of the Secwepemc (Shuswap) Nation, located in the Cariboo region of the Central Interior region of the Canadian province of British Columbia. It was created when the government of the then-Colony of British Columbia established an Indian reserve system in the 1860s.  It is a member government of the Northern Shuswap Tribal Council.

In the Shuswap language, Soda Creek is called Xats'ull, while Deep Creek is Cmetem'.  
Xat'sull, (pronounced hat-shall) means "on the cliff where the bubbling water comes out".

The one of the many First Nation's Chief has been Bev Sellars, a lawyer and writer who was a finalist for the Burt Award for First Nations, Métis and Inuit Literature in 2014 for her Indian residential schools memoir They Called Me Number One.

The Xat'sull/Cmetem' First Nation has not signed any treaty with any settler-colonial political entity, nor has it ceded any land and let go its territorial claims. As part of the Northern Secwepemc te Qelmucw (Tribal Council), Xat'sull/Cmetem' First Nation has been in negotiation with the government of Canada and the government of British Columbia regarding a final treaty settling this matter. An "Agreement in Principle" was signed in 2018. Once a final agreement is signed between the Tribal Council, Canada, and British Columbia, it is expected that the Indian Reserves will be abolished, the territories under jurisdiction of Xat'sull/Cmetem' First Nation will expand significantly, and former reserves will be absorbed into settlement land under sovereignty of Xat'sull/Cmetem' First Nation.

Indian Reserves

The Soda Creek/Deep Creek Band has only two Indian Reserves: As explained before, these reserves were unilaterally defined by the Government of British Columbia, and thus the Band has never retracted its claim on its territory. These reserves are expected to be abolished and absorbed into settlement lands, after the signing of a final agreement.

Deep Creek Indian Reserve No. 2, 7 miles southeast of the mount of Deep (Hawks) Creek on the Fraser River, 1661.60 ha. 
Soda Creek Indian Reserve No. 1, on the left (E) bank of the Fraser River, 1 mile south of the Soda Creek BCR (CN) station, 431.10 ha.

See also

Northern Shuswap Tribal Council
Canim Lake, British Columbia
Soda Creek, British Columbia

References

External links
Soda Creek Band website
Northern Shuswap Tribal Council website
Shuswap Nation website

Secwepemc governments
Cariboo
First Nations governments in the Fraser Canyon